Clarence Coe may refer to:

 Clarence S. Coe (1865–1939), American master bridge builder and railroad civil engineer
 Clarence Clinton Coe (1864–1936), member of the Wisconsin State Assembly
 Clarence E. Coe (1873–1943), early settler in Palms, California and a member of the Los Angeles City Council